Michael Jennings (born September 7, 1979) is a former American football wide receiver.

High school years
Jennings attended Nathan Bedford Forest High School in Jacksonville, Florida and was a student, and earned three letters in football and one in track as a senior sprinter.

College years
Jennings never played football in college.  He was a track and field athlete at Florida State, earning 3 letters as a Seminole and winning the ACC Championship as a member of the 4 × 400 relay team.

Professional career
Michael Jennings entered the National Football League by signing with the San Francisco 49ers in 2002, but was cut before the season. Jennings was then selected in the 4th round of the 2003 NFL Europe Free Agent Draft by the Scottish Claymores.  In 2004, he signed with the New England Patriots and the Baltimore Ravens before being cut by both.  He finally made the New York Giants roster in 2005, after which he allocated to NFL Europa and played for the Berlin Thunder.  He played in his first NFL game in the 2006 season. He was a starter in the 2nd preseason game of 2007 against the Baltimore Ravens. In the game, he made a diving catch and in doing so he ruptured his achilles tendon leaving him out for the season.

The Giants put Jennings on injured reserve due to his career-threatening injury.

The following year, he once again tried out for the Giants but was released after the final cuts.

References

External links

1979 births
Living people
Players of American football from Jacksonville, Florida
American football wide receivers
Florida State University alumni
San Francisco 49ers players
Scottish Claymores players
New England Patriots players
Baltimore Ravens players
Berlin Thunder players
New York Giants players
Indianapolis Colts players